Regret Over the Wires is an album by Matthew Ryan, released September 23, 2003 by Hybrid Recordings.

Track listing
All words and music by Matthew Ryan, except where noted.
"Return to Me" – 4:48
"The Little Things" – 3:00
"Trouble Doll" – 4:50
"Long Blvd." – 3:39
"I Can't Steal You" – 4:13
"Caged Bird" – 4:15
"Come Home" – 3:01
"I Hope Your God Has Mercy on Mine" – 3:21
"Nails" (music by J. J. Johnson, Doug Lancio, Mark Robertson, Matthew Ryan) – 4:12
"Sweetie" (music by Doug Lancio) – 3:12
"Every Good Thing" – 2:42
"Skylight" – 4:49

Personnel
 Mark Robertson - bass, backing vocals
 J. J. Johnson - drums, percussion
 Kevin Teel - electric guitar
 Doug Lancio - electric guitar, acoustic guitar, slide guitar, baritone guitar, resonator guitar, mandolin, synth, backing vocals
 Matthew Ryan - vocals, guitar, piano, synth, organ

References

2003 albums
Matthew Ryan (musician) albums
Folktronica albums